The Annie Award for Production Design in an Animated Television/Broadcast Production is an Annie Award given annually to the best production design in animated television or broadcasting productions. Prior to the creation of the category in 1997, television productions competed alongside feature films in the Best Individual Achievement for Artistic Excellence in the Field of Animation award, presented in 1994, later renamed Best Individual Achievement for Production Design in the Field of Animation to for 1995 and 1996.

Winners and nominees

1990s
Best Individual Achievement for Artistic Excellence in the Field of Animation

Best Individual Achievement for Production Design in the Field of Animation

 Best Individual Achievement: Production Design in a Television Production

2000s

2010s

2020s

References

External links 
 Annie Awards: Legacy

Annie Awards
Annie